Caetano da Costa Alegre (26 April 1864 – 18 April 1890) was a Portuguese poet.

Biography
Born to a Cape Verdean crioulo family in the  colony of São Tomé in Portuguese São Tomé and Príncipe, off the coast of Africa, he settled in Portugal in 1882 and attended medical school in Lisbon, hoping to become a naval doctor, but died of tuberculosis in Alcobaça before he could fulfill his dream.

He wrote several reviews under his name including A Imprensa (1885-1891) and A Leitura (1894–96), the last one was posthumously published.

Publications of his poems
In 1916, a friend, journalist Cruz Magalhãez, published the poetry he wrote during the eight years Costa Alegre lived in Portugal. The work, written in the popular romantic style of the time, was an immediate success, not least because of how it celebrates his African origins, expresses longing for his home in São Tomé, and describes the sense of alienation he feels because of his race. He expresses his sorrow after being rejected by a white woman because of the color of his skin in one of the earliest attempts by an African poet to deal with issues of race.  Three republications of his poems were made in 1950, 1951 and in 1994.

Poetic style
Though distinctly European in style, the themes of Costa Alegre's work make him a precursor to later African authors and poets, who dealt with issues of race, alienation, and nostalgic reveries for the past (in his case, his reminiscences about São Tomé).

Poems
One of the poems he wrote was Visão meaning vision.

Vi-te passar, longe de mim, distante,
Como uma estátua de ébano ambulante;
Ias de luto, doce, tutinegra,
E o teu aspecto pesaroso e triste
Prendeu minha alma, sedutora negra;
Depois, cativa de invisível laço,
(o teu encanto, a que ninguém resiste)
Foi-te seguindo o pequenino passo
Até que o vulto gracioso e lindo
Desapareceu, longe de mim, distante,
Como uma estátua de ébano ambulante.

See also
Cape Verdean people in São Tomé and Príncipe

References

External links
Poems by Caetano de Alegre 
Caetano da Costa Alegre at Encyclopædia Britannica
Biography of Caetano da Costa Alegre at Lusofônia Poética 

1864 births
1890 deaths
19th-century deaths from tuberculosis
19th-century Portuguese poets
São Tomé and Príncipe poets
São Tomé and Príncipe people of Cape Verdean descent
Tuberculosis deaths in Portugal
Portuguese expatriates in São Tomé and Príncipe
19th-century poets
19th-century male writers
Portuguese male poets